St Guinoch, also known as Guinochus or Guinoc, was a Scottish saint.  He is believed to have been a counsellor to Kenneth MacAlpin and, through prayer, aided in seven victories over the Picts in one day.

References

Year of birth unknown
Medieval Scottish saints
9th-century Scottish people